Tiago Monteiro Pereira (born 8 June 1989) is a Portuguese handballer who plays for Sélestat Alsace and the Portugal national team.

Career
Born in Guimarães, Pereira is a youth product of ABC Braga academy, and made his debut in the first tier in the 2006–07 season, as the Northern side conquer their twelfth title. In his following two years, he help the club add back-to-back, Portuguese Cup win's.

A student enrolled in University of Minho, he competed in the 21st World University Championship, taking part in Portuguese campaign that finished runner-up to Czech Republic, while individually, he won the Most Valuable Player award for the tournament.

Shortly after the tournament, Pereira moved to Benfica, reuniting with former coach, Jorge Rito  and helping the club to a Super Cup conquest in his first year. After several seasons without silverware, he guided his team  to a fifth Portuguese Handball Cup win in April 2016, after beating Sporting by 36–35. He also helped them reach the play-off finals of the Andebol 1 league and the EHF Challenge Cup Final, losing both to ABC Braga. In his fifth year at Benfica, Pereira won his second Super Cup, scoring once in a 25–24 win over ABC Braga. It was his final season at the club, as he signed a two-year deal with Sélestat Alsace on 4 May 2017.

Honours
ABC Braga
Portuguese First Division: 2006–07
Portuguese Cup: 2007–08, 2008–09

Benfica
Portuguese Handball Cup: 2015–16
Portuguese Super Cup: 2012, 2016

References

External links
 EHF page

1989 births
Living people
Sportspeople from Guimarães
Portuguese male handball players
S.L. Benfica handball players
Expatriate handball players